Emilson Nictael Cruz Sandrez (born 24 October 1987) is a Honduran football player, who most recently played for F.C. Motagua in the Honduras National League.

Club career
He was promoted from Águilas del Motagua by Jaime de la Pava to the seniors of Motagua in 2008, alongside future World Cup player Georgie Welcome.

References

External links
 CONMEBOL.com – Motagua squad Copa Sudamericana 2008

1987 births
Living people
Sportspeople from Tegucigalpa
Association football midfielders
Honduran footballers
F.C. Motagua players
Liga Nacional de Fútbol Profesional de Honduras players